Stenocercus bolivarensis, the Bolivar whorltail iguana, is a species of lizard of the Tropiduridae family. It is found in Colombia.

References

Stenocercus
Reptiles described in 1982
Endemic fauna of Colombia
Reptiles of Colombia